Don't Walk Away may refer to:
Don't Walk Away (EP), an EP by Bullet for My Valentine
 "Don't Walk Away" (Electric Light Orchestra song), 1980
 "Don't Walk Away" (Rick Springfield song), 1984
 "Don't Walk Away" (Pat Benatar song), 1988
 "Don't Walk Away" (Jade song), 1992, later covered by Javine, 2004
 "Don't Walk Away", a song by the Four Tops from the album Tonight!, 1981
 "Don't Walk Away", a song by Toni Childs from the album Union, 1988
 "Don't Walk Away", a song by Bad English from the album Bad English, 1989
 "Don't Walk Away", a song by Danger Danger from the album Danger Danger, 1989
 "Don't Walk Away", a song by Michael Jackson from Invincible, 2001
 "Don't Walk Away", a song from the play What's Done in the Dark by Tyler Perry, 2006
 "Don't Walk Away", a song by Sofia Rotaru from the album Ya – tvoya lybov'!, 2008
 "Don't Walk Away", a song by Basshunter from the album Bass Generation, 2009
 "Don't Walk Away", a song from the soundtrack Hannah Montana: The Movie, 2009
 "Don't Walk Away", a song by Kim Jaejoong from the album WWW, 2013